Victoria Kan is the defending champion, having won the previous edition in 2013.

Donna Vekić won the title, defeating Sara Sorribes Tormo in the final, 6–2, 6–7(7–9), 6–3.

Seeds

Main draw

Finals

Top half

Bottom half

References 
 Main draw

Soho Square Ladies Tournament - Singles